Turnaround is the fourth studio album by Irish boy band Westlife, released on 24 November 2003 by BMG. The first single released was the upbeat track, "Hey Whatever". The next single was a cover of the Barry Manilow hit, "Mandy". The band's version earned them their 12th UK number one and an Irish record of the year award. "Obvious", an original song, was the third and final single released from the album.

Turnaround was also the last album to be recorded with their full original lineup with member Brian McFadden, who left the band in March the following year. The album was the 23rd best selling album of 2003 in the UK. The album was re-released in a box set on 25 January 2005 with their debut album, Westlife. The album received favourable reviews from music critics, while it attained commercial success, topping the UK and Ireland charts, while reaching the top-ten in many countries.

Background and McFadden's departure 

After three successful albums, Westlife (1999), Coast to Coast (2000) and World of Our Own (2001), the band released their first greatest hits album, Unbreakable: The Greatest Hits Volume 1, in 2002, amidst rumours of a split. After the greatest hits, the band released Turnaround as their fourth studio album, on 23 December 2003. Kian Egan said, "the passion and love we have for Westlife is still 100%", and the group felt that Turnaround is their best album yet.

Turnaround was the band's final album with lead vocalist Brian McFadden, who left the group three weeks prior to embarking on their fourth world tour, stating that, "It's hard to juggle two lives when you've got a family." He subsequently re-emerged as a solo artist and professed disgruntlement over the requirements associated with boy band captivity. When interviewed by Wil Marlow of The Journal, McFadden said, "I was standing there trying to sing a song like "Mandy" and be all emotional when I've never even met a Mandy."

Music 
"Turnaround" is a pop album, with many songs being "down-tempo" ballads, mixing with plenty of "upbeat" tracks, as well. The album features 2 covers and 11 new tracks. It features writing contribution from Wayne Hector, Steve Mac, Diane Warren, Andreas Carlsson and others.

The album kicks off with "Mandy", who first hit the charts, as "Brandy", 32 years ago before Barry Manilow renamed it "Mandy" and took it to number 11 in 1975. "Hey Whatever" is an upbeat pop song with gospel influence, with its "shun-the-world-and-find-your-bliss" message, "Why don't you liberate your mind / Let your colour fill the sky," the sing. "Obvious" is a soft ballad, with backing vocals that sound "either wistful or magical," according to Peter Fawthrop of Allmusic. Eamonn McCuske of The Digital Fix commented that the song "bears similarity to Take That's Back For Good.

"When a Woman Loves a Man" was considered a "classic Westlife ballad," while the title track "Turnaround" has funky, electronic, 80s influences, being called "heavily synthesised." Diane Warren contributed to the ballad "I Did It for You," while "Thank You" is another "upbeat" track. "To Be with You is a re-recording of the Mr. Big song. It was named a "faithful" and "nevertheless adequate" cover. "Home" was considered a "soaring ballad." Final track "What Do They Know" closes the album off, tying all the styles together.

Critical reception 

Turnaround received generally favourable reviews from music critics. Peter Fawthrop of AllMusic gave the album a rating of 3 out of 5 stars, writing that " Turnaround involves a pebble toss toward rock, and it's all the better for it. If it had gone all the way, if it had found a producer willing to risk fortunes on morphing a pop group into a rock group, something remarkable may have happened. As it stands, it is a notch above typical, but only a notch." Linda McGee of RTÉ.ie gave the album 3 out of 5 stars, commenting, "Refreshingly, much of the material reveals a grittier side to the band that was never evident before. By finding a formula that was capable of sticking the distance, Westlife have defied the odds by making it to their fifth album. Few would have thought it. Vocally, 'Turnaround' is faultless. Commercially, you've got to hand it to the lads on a market sewn up."

Clea Marshall of NZ Girl called it "upbeat, catchy and slick," writing, "this album is quintessential Westlife. Easy on the ears, 'Turnaround' is sure to bring a smile to any pop fan's face." Jack Smith of BBC Music called it "average," declaring that, "The title Westlife chose is lost on us because this seems like more of the same from the puppy-dog-eyed five piece." Eamonn McCusker of The Digital Fix commented that the songs "all sound somewhat alike with there being precious little to get excited about across any of the thirteen tracks here."

Commercial performance 
Turnaround debuted at number-one on the UK Albums Chart, becoming the band's fourth album to debut at the top. It spent 21 weeks on the chart. It also debuted at number-one on the Irish Albums Chart, spending a further week at the top. It spent a total of 18 weeks inside the chart. The album was also successful in Sweden, where it debuted at number 10, on 28 November 2003. Later, it climbed to number 6, while in its third week, it peaked at number 5, on 12 December 2003.

In Denmark, the album debuted at number 4 on the Danish Albums Chart on 5 December 2003. It spent 16 weeks on the chart. In Austria, the album debuted and peaked at number 42 on the Austrian Albums Chart, on 7 December 2003. Later, it fell to number 63, while in its third week, it climbed to number 53. After weeks fluctuating the charts, the album jumped from number 73 to number 60. After the jump, it climbed to number 48. It spent 10 weeks on the chart.

Promotion

Singles 
The album's lead-single "Hey Whatever" attained success, reaching number 4 on the UK Singles Chart, therefore becoming the lowest-charting single from the album. It eventually was a success around the world, reaching number 2 in Denmark and Ireland, number 5 in Sweden and the top-forty in some other countries. The album's second single, "Mandy", topped the UK Singles Chart, becoming their 12th number one hit on the UK charts. The song also topped the Irish Singles Chart and was a success in Europe, reaching the top-ten in Denmark and Sweden and the top-twenty in Austria, Germany and Norway. The third single, "Obvious," was also a success, reaching number 2 in Ireland, number 3 in the UK and number 7 in Denmark, while also charting in many countries.

The Turnaround Tour 2004

Track listing

Credits

<small>
Arranged By [Strings]: Dave Arch (tracks: 1, 3, 8) Henrik And Ulf Jansson (tracks: 4, 5) Tue Røh* (track 12)Wil Malone (tracks: 6, 11)
Bass:Andreas "Quiz" Romdhane (track 4) Steve Pearce (tracks: 2, 3, 6, 8 to 11)
Drums: Brett Morgan (track 3) Chris Laws (tracks: 1, 2, 6, 7, 9, 11) Ian Thomas (tracks: 1, 6 to 8, 10, 11) Ralph Salmins (track 2)
Engineer: Chris Laws (tracks: 1 to 3, 6 to 11, 13) Daniel Pursey (tracks: 1, 2) Lee McCutcheon (track 1) Robin Sellars (tracks: 1 to 3, 6, 7, 11, 13) Steve Price (tracks: 6, 11)
Engineer [Assistant]: Daniel Pursey (tracks: 1, 3, 6 to 11) Mat Bartram (tracks: 6, 11) Steve Mustarde (tracks: 6, 7, 10, 11)
Guitar [Guitars]: Esbjörn Öhrwal (track 4, 5)  Fridrik 'Frizzy' Karlsson (tracks: 1, 2, 6, 8 to 11, 13)Jonas Krag (track 12) Paul Gendler (tracks: 3, 7, 8, 10, 11)

<small>
Keyboards: David Stenmarck (track 3) Joe Belmaati (track 12) Nick Jarl (track 3) Steve Mac (tracks: 2, 6, 7, 9, 11) Tue Røh* (track 12)
Leader [String]: Gavin Wright (tracks: 3, 6, 8, 11)
Mastered By: Bob Ludwig (tracks: 2, 6 to 9) Jacko (tracks: 1, 4, 5, 10 to 13) Tim Young (track 3)
Mixed By: Bernard Löhr (tracks: 4, 5) Bob Clearmountain (tracks: 2, 8 to 10) Cutfather And Joe* (tracks: 12) Mads Nilson (tracks: 12) Stefan Glaumann (tracks: 3) Steve Mac (tracks: 1, 6, 7, 11, 13)
Mixed By [Assistant]:Kevin Harp (tracks: 2, 8 to 10)
Organ [Hammond]: Dave Arch (tracks: 2, 3, 8, 10)
Percussion: Frank Ricotti (tracks: 1, 6, 8, 10, 11)
Piano: Andreas Romdhane (track 5) Dave Arch (track 3) Kristoffer Nergårdh (track 5) Stefan Jernsthal (track 4) Steve Mac (tracks: 1, 2, 6, 8, 9, 11, 13)

Charts

Weekly charts

Year-end charts

Certifications and sales

References

External links
Official Westlife Website

2003 albums
Westlife albums
Albums produced by Cutfather
Albums produced by Steve Mac
RCA Records albums
Sony BMG albums